Walter Brundell was an association football player who represented New Zealand, playing in New Zealand's first ever official international.

Brundell made his full All Whites debut in New Zealand's inaugural A-international fixture, beating Australia 3–1 on 17 June 1922. Brundell made only one other international appearance, in New Zealand's second match, a 1–1 draw with Australia on 24 June 1923.

References

External links
 

Year of birth missing
Year of death missing
New Zealand association footballers
New Zealand international footballers
Association football midfielders